Bolo Township is located in Washington County, Illinois, United States. As of the 2010 census, its population was 419 and it contained 173 housing units.

Geography

Demographics

References

External links
City-data.com
Illinois State Archives

Townships in Washington County, Illinois
Townships in Illinois